John Emmett Hannagan (16 May 1885 – 12 September 1977) was an Australian rules footballer who played with St Kilda in the Victorian Football League (VFL).

Notes

External links 

1885 births
Australian rules footballers from Victoria (Australia)
St Kilda Football Club players
1977 deaths